
Daniel Sharp, D.D. (December 25, 1783 - June 25, 1853) was pastor of the Charles Street Baptist Church, Boston, Massachusetts, for more than forty years, from 1812 to about 1853. He was one of the founders of the Newton Theological Institution.

He was born December 25, 1783, in Huddersfield in Yorkshire, England. His father was a Baptist pastor. Daniel was a member of the Congregational Church when, after some success in business, he emigrated to the United States in 1806 and soon joined the Baptists. He studied theology with Dr. William Staughton in Philadelphia beginning in March 1807 and was ordained pastor of the First Baptist Church in Newark, New Jersey, in 1809.

He became pastor of Charles Street Baptist Church in Boston in 1812, having previously been invited to preach there in 1809 and 1811. He was secretary of the Baptist Society for the Propagation of the Gospel in India and Foreign Parts when it was formed in February 1813 and he prayers for the missions a regular practice for his congregation. Throughout his career he held administrative positions in the Massachusetts Baptist Missionary Society. He was a fellow of the corporation of Brown University and a member of the Board of Overseers of Harvard University.

As the head of a congregation and a leader of Baptist organizations, Sharp faced the dilemma of maintaining unity while providing moral guidance on the most contentious issues of his era, war and slavery. Preaching on April 2, 1846, on the subject of war and peace, he described the pastor's duty and used slavery to make his point:

Sharp was a member and at times a vice president of the American Peace Society, which sought non-violent resolution to international conflicts. Though many Baptist pastors thought differently, he opposed the Mexican–American War and in June 1846, shortly after the US declared war, he published a "Discourse on Peace" that called it "a war for southern territory, waged against justice, against humanity, and against the voice of God".

His health declined in 1852 and his service as pastor in Boston ended about 1853 when he traveled south seeking warmer weather. He died on June 23, 1853, in the village of Stoneley outside Baltimore. The Boston Journal wrote in an obituary that "his views upon public affairs, and upon the great movements of the day ... were sound, practical and conservative, and fraught with benevolence".

References

Additional sources

External links
 WorldCat
 Charles Street Meeting House web site

1783 births
1853 deaths
American Christian clergy
19th century in Boston
Clergy from Boston
Baptist ministers from the United States